My Universe may refer to:

 My Universe (album), by the Shires, 2016
 My Universe Tour, their 2016–2017 tour in support of the album
 "My Universe" (song), by Coldplay and BTS, 2021
 "My Universe", a song by Stray Kids from the 2020 album In Life, a re-release of Go Live

See also
 My Universe in Lower Case, a 2011 Mexican drama film
 Mr. Universe (disambiguation)